Roy Helu Sr. (born 1953) is a Tongan-born American former rugby union player. He moved to the United States in 1974. He was a centre for the United States rugby union team and played in the 1987 Rugby World Cup. He earned 12 caps for his adopted country in his entire career, which spanned from 1981 to his last match in 1987 against Australia at the World Cup.

Personal 
He is the father of former Washington Redskins and Oakland Raiders running back Roy Helu.

References

External links 
ESPN Scrum Profile

1953 births
Tongan rugby union players
American rugby union players
United States international rugby union players
Rugby union centres
Living people